Cyrtodactylus agarwali is a species of gecko endemic to India.

The gecko was named after Ishan Argawal, an Indian herpetologist.

References

Cyrtodactylus
Reptiles described in 2021